Headlong is a novel by Michael Frayn, published in 1999.

The plot centres on the discovery of a long-lost painting from Pieter Bruegel's series The Months. The story is essentially a farce, but contains a large amount of scholarship about the painter.
Frayn distinguishes between the iconology and iconography of the paintings and suggests that rather than simply being a series of pastoral images they symbolise a Dutch populace undergoing great suffering as a result of Spanish rule.

The novel was shortlisted for the 1999 Booker Prize.  An abridged version by Paul Kent and read by Martin Jarvis was first broadcast on BBC Radio 4 in 1999.  A dramatized radio play directed by Clive Brill and produced by Ann Scott was broadcast on BBC Radio 4 in 2013.

Plot
Martin, the main character, is supposed to be writing a book. He finds himself invited to dinner at the house of a repellent and warring couple, on whom the land and property they own seems entirely wasted. Martin happens on a painting which he takes to be by Bruegel.  Painstaking research leads him (via a full scale reassessment of the interpretation of the five surviving pictures in Bruegel's The Months) to identify the picture as the missing sixth picture of Bruegel's famous book of hours. Meantime his wife, (an actual art historian whereas he is only peripherally connected with the scholarly art world), and their baby live in a cottage and he fears his wife eyes him with increasing disdain as, instead of working on his book, he pursues the Bruegel data.

Martin has to fake the promise of an affair with the woman of the house to get hold of the picture, and indulge in a series of implausible transactions in other pictures to keep his access to the Bruegel open. Once he gets it, his troubles have only begun. Finally, as he is about to succeed in taking it to a safe place and secure his fortune, he crashes the old Landrover and the picture goes up in smoke. We never do find out if it was a Bruegel or not.

References

Review on Publishers Weekly

1999 British novels
Novels about artists
Novels by Michael Frayn
Faber and Faber books